Thomas K. Burman (born January 4, 1966) is an American athletics administrator who is the current director of athletics for the University of Wyoming. He previously served as athletic director for Portland State University, and as associate athletic director for the University of Wyoming. Burman is a graduate of the University of Wyoming and Robert Morris University.

References

External links

Wyoming Cowboys bio

Living people
1966 births
Portland State Vikings athletic directors
Wyoming Cowboys and Cowgirls athletic directors